New Union is an unincorporated community and Census-designated place in Coffee County, Tennessee. The population was 1,646 at the 2020 census, up from 1,431 at the 2010 census.

Demographics

References

Census-designated places in Coffee County, Tennessee
Census-designated places in Tennessee